Ebstein is a surname. Notable people with this surname include:

Katja Ebstein (born 1945), German singer
Richard Ebstein (born 1943), American behavioral geneticist
Wilhelm Ebstein (1836–1912), German physician

See also

Epstein